Crosby High School can refer to:

 Crosby High School (Connecticut), located in Waterbury, Connecticut
 Crosby High School (Texas), located in Crosby, Texas